Zabbix is an open-source software tool to monitor IT infrastructure such as networks, servers, virtual machines, and cloud services. Zabbix collects and displays basic metrics.

Description
Zabbix is designed primarily as an IT infrastructure monitoring tool. New features are generally released every six months to major versions and every 1.5 years to LTS versions.

Released under the terms of GNU General Public License version 2, Zabbix is free software that does not require an additional license to use any of its features. Even though Zabbix is open-source software, it is a closed development software product, developed by Zabbix LLC based in Riga, Latvia.

Early in its history, Zabbix was described as simple to set up compared to other monitoring solutions. However, later it was considered by some to need a significant amount of manual configuration. As an open-source product however Zabbix focusses on the usage of existing tools and functionality as well as proprietary solutions to achieve a scalable monitoring solution.

Development

The first stable version, 1.0, was released in 2004. Since the first stable version was released as 1.0, Zabbix versioning has used minor version numbers to denote major releases. Each minor release implements many new features, while change level releases mostly introduce bugfixes.

Zabbix version numbering scheme has changed over time. While the first two stable branches were 1.0 and 1.1, after 1.1 it was decided to use odd numbers for development versions and even numbers for stable versions. As a result, 1.3 followed 1.1 as a development update to be released as 1.4.

See also

 Comparison of network monitoring systems
 List of systems management systems

References

Further reading

 Vidmar, Anže (March 12, 2007). ZABBIX: State-of-the-art network monitoring Linux.com
 Ramm, Mark (March 15, 2005). , Linux Magazine
 Schroder, Carla (May 24, 2005). Monitor Your Net with Free, High-Performance ZABBIX, Enterprise Networking Planet
 Wallen, Jack (March 8, 2022). Network monitoring tools every admin should know Tech Republic

External links
 
 

Internet Protocol based network software
Free network management software
Multi-agent network management software
2001 software
System monitors
Management systems
Systems management